Newcomer may refer to:

 Newcomer (surname)
 Newcomer (Lenape), chief of the western Lenape and founder of Newcomerstown, Ohio
 Newcomer, Missouri, a community in the United States
 Novichok agent, Novichok meaning 'Newcomer' in Russian language
 Shinzanmono, or The Newcomer, 2010 Japanese television drama

See also
 The Newcomers (disambiguation)
 Newcomerstown, Ohio
 Neophyte (disambiguation)
 Newbie
 Novice